Trips For Kids is a non-profit community service organization that provides beginner and intermediate-level mountain bike outings, environmental education, bicycle mechanics training and earn-a-bike programs for youth in the United States and Canada, especially those most in need. Legally based in Marin County, California, over 200,000 children have been served by 75 Trips for Kids chapters in the United States and Canada as of December 2017.

History
Trips for Kids was founded in Marin County, California in 1988 by Marilyn Price, a social activist, environmentalist and Mountain Bike Hall of Fame inductee.  Price used the mountain bike to teach at-risk, underserved youth lessons in personal responsibility, achievement and environmental awareness through the development of practical skills. Price formed the nonprofit Trips for Kids-Marin, the organization's flagship program, and began national outreach in the mid-1990s to inspire new chapters. Independent chapters began to form throughout the United States, Canada, Israel and briefly in Sierra Leone, growing to 75 chapters as of August 2017.

Programs and chapters
In addition to the Discovery Trail Rides Program, Trips for Kids chapters may also run Adventure Ride Clubs, Earn-a-Bike Workshops, Mobile Bike Clinics, camps and other programs. Five chapters also operate recyclery community bike thrift shops.

National Umbrella Organization
On August 1, 2017, a new 501c3 national umbrella organization was established to provide support for Trips for Kids chapters, build new chapters, improve program quality, and promote the organization.

National Board of Directors 
Patricia Gallery, President

Dan Jeffris, Treasurer

Chris Degenaars, Secretary

References

External links

Child-related organizations in the United States
Youth organizations based in California
Organizations based in Marin County, California
Outdoor recreation organizations